Catherine Ebert-Gray (born 1955) is an American diplomat. She served as the United States ambassador to Papua New Guinea, Solomon Islands and Vanuatu.

Early life and education
Born Catherine Ebert in Appleton, Wisconsin, she lived in Neenah and Menasha, Wisconsin as well as Chicago, Illinois and Detroit, Michigan before she graduated from Appleton West High School. She developed an interest in history and the Pacific from her father, a veteran who served on the USS Chanticleer in the Pacific theater. She earned her bachelor's degrees in international relations and political science from the University of Wisconsin-Madison. Later she received a master's degree in national resource management from the Dwight D. Eisenhower School for National Security and Resource Strategy.

Career
Ebert-Gray began her career as an analyst in the Hawaii State Legislature. In 1988  she joined the United States Foreign Service and subsequently served in several international locations, including Mali, Morocco, Togo, Egypt, Germany, the Philippines, Papua New Guinea, and Australia.

When she was nominated by President Barack Obama to become U.S. Ambassador, she was serving as Deputy Assistant Secretary of State in the Bureau of Administration's Office of Logistics Management, a role she had held since 2011. On February 11, 2016, Ebert-Gray arrived in Port Moresby after having been confirmed on December 9, 2015 by the United States Senate. Her swearing-in as the U.S. Ambassador to Papua New Guinea, Vanuatu and the Solomon Islands took place on January 22, 2016. Her mission ended on November 17, 2019.

Personal
She is married to Australian Ian Gray, and they have two children. She speaks both English and French.

See also

References

1955 births
Living people
Ambassadors of the United States to Papua New Guinea
Ambassadors of the United States to the Solomon Islands
Ambassadors of the United States to Vanuatu
National Defense University alumni
Obama administration personnel
People from Appleton, Wisconsin
United States Department of State officials
University of Wisconsin–Madison College of Letters and Science alumni
United States Foreign Service personnel
American women ambassadors
21st-century American women
21st-century American diplomats